Elif Büşra Pekin (born 30 June 1982 in Saudi Arabia) is a Turkish actress and screenwriter. Her family is of Turkish descent. After Ottoman Empire collapsed, her paternal family immigrated from Thessaloniki. She grew up in İzmir and United States.

She graduated from theatre department of Dokuz Eylül University. She is best known for theatrical sketch comedy Çok Güzel Hareketler Bunlar and film based from life of Dilberay. She played many popular films and series since 2004.

Filmography

Movies

TV series

TV programs

References

External links 

1982 births
Living people
Turkish film actresses